Cariboo South was a provincial electoral district for the Legislative Assembly of British Columbia, Canada from 1991 to 2009.

Demographics

Member of Legislative Assembly 
Its last MLA was Charlie Wyse, a former city councillor for Williams Lake. He was first elected in 2005. He represented the New Democratic Party of British Columbia. He ran again in the newly created riding of Cariboo-Chilcotin for the 2009 election and was defeated.

Election results 

|-
 
|NDP
|Charlie Wyse
|align="right"|7,277
|align="right"|45.99%
|align="right"|
|align="right"|$53,725

|-

|Independent
|Mike Orr
|align="right"|532
|align="right"|3.36%
|align="right"|
|align="right"|$954
|- bgcolor="white"
!align="right" colspan=3|Total Valid Votes
!align="right"|15,823
!align="right"|100%
!align="right"|
|- bgcolor="white"
!align="right" colspan=3|Total Rejected Ballots
!align="right"|93
!align="right"|0.59%
!align="right"|
|- bgcolor="white"
!align="right" colspan=3|Turnout
!align="right"|15,916
!align="right"|67.43%
!align="right"|

 
|NDP
|David Zirnhelt
|align="right"|4,259
|align="right"|25.83%
|align="right"|$40,430

|- bgcolor="white"
!align="right" colspan=3|Total Valid Votes
!align="right"|16,490
!align="right"|100.00%
|- bgcolor="white"
!align="right" colspan=3|Total Rejected Ballots
!align="right"|66
!align="right"|0.40%
|- bgcolor="white"
!align="right" colspan=3|Turnout
!align="right"|16,556
!align="right"|74.70%

|-
 
|NDP
|David Zirnhelt
|align="right"|6,372
|align="right"|41.45%
|align="right"|
|align="right"|$40,565

|-

|- bgcolor="white"
!align="right" colspan=3|Total Valid Votes
!align="right"|15,373
!align="right"|100.00%
!align="right"|
|- bgcolor="white"
!align="right" colspan=3|Total Rejected Ballots
!align="right"|69
!align="right"|0.45%
!align="right"|
|- bgcolor="white"
!align="right" colspan=3|Turnout
!align="right"|15,442
!align="right"|70.88%
!align="right"|

|-
 
|NDP
|David Zirnhelt
|align="right"|6,369
|align="right"|45.37%
|align="right"|
|align="right"|$44,267
|-

|- bgcolor="white"
!align="right" colspan=3|Total Valid Votes
!align="right"|14,037
!align="right"|100.00%
!align="right"|
|- bgcolor="white"
!align="right" colspan=3|Total Rejected Ballots
!align="right"|316
!align="right"|2.20%
!align="right"|
|- bgcolor="white"
!align="right" colspan=3|Turnout
!align="right"|14,353
!align="right"|72.94%

External links 
BC Stats - 2001 (pdf)
Results of 2001 election (pdf)
2001 Expenditures (pdf)
Results of 1996 election
1996 Expenditures (pdf)
Results of 1991 election
1991 Expenditures
Website of the Legislative Assembly of British Columbia

Former provincial electoral districts of British Columbia